Šaca is a borough (city ward) of Košice, Slovakia. One of Šaca's localities is Bužinka, which includes some of the borough's older historical architecture.

History 
The first written record about Šaca dates back to 1275. Since 1427 the landowners of Šaca were the Semsey family, who built a castle here in the 15th century. It was demolished later in the same century, on the order of the King Matthias Corvinus. Later members of the family built a rococo manor house in Šaca in the late 18th century, which stands to this day. Water mills were operated in Šaca since the Middle Ages, until 1950.

After World War II, the village became a residential district for builders of a new steelworks company - Východoslovenské železiarne Košice (VSŽ Košice - "Eastern Slovak Iron Works in Košice"). In January 1960 construction started on more than 8 square kilometres of land. In 1965 the first blast furnace was fired up and production in the hot rolling mill and coke plant was started. In four decades the Košice mill has developed into a steel-producing plant that has managed to reach the markets and achieve a position among the significant steel producers. It has been accepted as a member of prestigious international organizations associating iron and steel producers and has become a partner of renowned foreign firms in joint ventures. The new phase in the history of the factory started on November 24, 2000 when the metallurgy production and commercial activities were sold to the leading American steel company The United States Steel Corporation - VSŽ Košice changed name on U. S. Steel Košice.

In the 1970s, Šaca gained an urban character and became one of 22 boroughs of Košice.

Evolution of the borough's name 

Some of the historical names of Šaca.

 1275 - Latin: Ida 
 1280 - terra Eghazas Ida
 1319 - poss. Saticha
 1328 - poss. Zethyce alio nomine Scenthtrinitas
 1344 - Setyche
 1372 - poss. Setyche
 1379 - poss. Sathicha, poss. Satycha
 1385 - Sathicha, poss. Sathycha alio nomine Screben
 1393 - Sathicha, Sagcza al. Nom. Zenthtrinitas
 1395 - poss. Seu villa Senthythe
 1409 - poss. Sethithe, poss. Sethyche
 1424 - villa Saczcza
 1427 - poss. Sechcha, Secha
 1428 - poss. Sathcza
 1469 - poss. Sacza
 1471 - poss. Saccza
 1474 - poss. Saczcza
 1477 - poss. Saczcza
 1514 - Saccza
 1553 - Sacha
 1773 - Hungarian: Szácza 
 1786 - Sacza
 1808 - Slovak: Ssáca, Hungarian: Sácza
 1863 - Saca
 1903 - sk: Šaca, hu: Sacza
 1906, 1938 - sk: Šaca, hu: Saca

Historical landmarks 

A 1770s Roman Catholic church in the Bužinka locality.

A rococo manor house of the Semsey family, built in the 1770s (in preserved condition), and a smaller manor house in the Bužinka locality (currently ruined).

Statistics
 Area: 
 Population: 5,890 (31 December 2017)
 Density of population: 140/km² (31 December 2017)
 District: Košice II
 Mayor: Daniel Petrík (as of 2018 elections)

Sports and recreation 
There are several sports facilities in the Šaca borough, including a football (soccer) stadium.

Gallery

References

External links

 Official website of the Šaca borough
 Article on the Šaca borough at Cassovia.sk
 Official website of U. S. Steel Košice
 Official website of Košice

Boroughs of Košice
Villages in Slovakia merged with towns